Chipwi (also Chibwe) is a town in the Kachin State of northernmost part of the Republic of the Union of Myanmar. It is the administrative centre for Chibwe Township, and is located beside the N'Mai River just below where Chibwe Creek enters it.

References

External links
Satellite map at Maplandia.com
"Chipwi, Burma" Falling Rain Genomics, Inc.

Township capitals of Myanmar
Populated places in Kachin State